Weggeland is a surname. Notable people with the surname include:

Dan Weggeland (1827–1918), Norwegian-born American artist and teacher
Ted Weggeland (born 1963), American lawyer, politician, and corporate executive